Tromakton is a Greek dance that usually precedes or follows a Tik. It is a fast dance which has a distinct double bounce which becomes more vigorous as the dance goes on. It is usually played before Atsiapat or Serra, because it has similar steps and it is like an introduction for these dances.

See also
Greek dances
Greek music

Greek dances
Greek music